Teplychne was an urban-type settlement (and constituent unit of its own settlement council) of the Shevchenkivskyi District (urban district) of the Zaporizhzhia Municipality in southern Ukraine. Its population was 2,630 in the 2001 Ukrainian Census.

Geography
Teplychne is located on the eastern outskirts of Zaporizhzhia near the Mokra Moskovka River. It is located to the immediate west of the Zaporizhzhia International Airport.

History
The settlement was first established in 1946 as the village of Zhdanova; it was given the status of an urban-type settlement on 27 September 1991. Teplychne was annexed to Zaporizhzhia's city limits and its status as an urban-type settlement was liquidated following on a resolution of the Zaporizhzhia Oblast Council dated 23 April 2009.

References

Neighborhoods of Zaporizhzhia
Populated places established in 1946
Populated places disestablished in 1991
1991 disestablishments in Ukraine
Populated places established in the Ukrainian Soviet Socialist Republic